Titan V was a steel roller coaster at Space World in Yahata Higashi ward, Kitakyushu, Japan.

Roller coasters in Japan
Roller coasters introduced in 1994